Patagonia Lake is a man-made reservoir in Santa Cruz County, Arizona, United States, located southwest of the town of Patagonia, Arizona and northeast of Nogales. The lake was created by damming Sonoita Creek, and is a popular area for boating and sport fishing. Facilities are maintained by Arizona State Parks as part of Patagonia Lake State Park.

Fish species
Reproducing fish species located in Patagonia Lake are largemouth bass, black crappie, bluegill, green sunfish, flathead catfish, threadfin shad, redear sunfish, channel catfish, and American bullfrogs. Rainbow trout are stocked every three weeks from October to March.

See also
 List of dams and reservoirs in Arizona

References

External links

 
 Arizona Fishing Locations Map
 Arizona Boating Locations Facilities Map
 Video of Patagonia Lake

Reservoirs in Santa Cruz County, Arizona
Reservoirs in Arizona